Florence Hull Winterburn (June 8, 1858 – ?) was an American author and editor. She was the author of Nursery Ethics, 1895, 1899; From the Child's Standpoint, 1859; Southern Hearts (short stories), 1901; and The Children's Health, 1901.

Early life and education
Florence Hull was born in Chicago, Illinois, June 8, 1858. She was the daughter of Captain Stephen Chester and Laura. (Bell) Hull.

Winterburn was educated in private schools and by private tutors in Washington, D.C. She graduated from a seminary for young ladies, and afterward took a two year course at College of Elocution and Acting at Washington, graduating with a B. E. A.. She then devoted twelve years to the study of Herbert Spencer's synthetic philosophy and was a student of psychology, heredity, as well as the theory and practice of education.

Career
She went to New York City in 1891, to do literary work and became special writer on child training.

Winterburn married first, T. G. Brown of Indiana. In 1893, in New York City, she married George W. Winterburn (died Nov. 18, 1911), physician, editor, and writer. Alter marriage, in 1892, she associated with husband in the conduct of the magazine Childhood, serving as its associate editor. It was the pioneer in the field of child study which thereafter become popular. She subsequently became editor of departments on this topic in various magazines.

Winterburn became the assistant editor of Godey's Lady's Book in 1893, and of Home and Country in 1895. For six years in the early 20th century, she was a special contributor of articles on sociology topics to  the Woman's Home Companion and other magazines; and one year as managing editor of the historical magazine, Americana. Winterburn was an essayist, and a writer of short stories for magazines, which were collected in a volume, Southern Hearts. She was also the author of Nursery Ethics; The Child’s Standpoint; The Children's Health; as well as Vacation Hints. Winterburn was also an occasional lecturer.

From 1903 to 1905, she lived abroad, especially in Paris, where she went to study psychology and literature. She made her home at 2 St. Nicholas Place, New York City.

Selected works
 Nursery Ethics, 1895, 1899
 From the Child's Standpoint, 1859
 Southern Hearts (short stories), 1901
 The Children's Health, 1901

References

Attribution

External links
 

1858 births
19th-century American non-fiction writers
19th-century American women writers
20th-century American women writers
Writers from Chicago
American magazine editors
Women magazine editors
American children's writers
American women children's writers
Year of death missing
American expatriates in France
Writers from New York City
American women short story writers
American women essayists
19th-century American essayists
20th-century American essayists